"RIDEBACK" is the fifth single of I've Sound singer, Mell. It was released on March 4, 2009 which serves as the opening theme for the anime series Rideback. The single has a Japanese version, a remix version and the instrumental version of the title track in addition to the original English track.

The single came in a regular CD-only edition (GNCV-0016) and a limited CD+DVD edition (GNCV-0015) which contained the PV for RIDEBACK.

Track listing 

RIDEBACK
Lyrics: Mell
Composition/Arrangement: Kazuya Takase
RIDEBACK -Japanese ver.-
Lyrics: Mell
Composition/Arrangement: Kazuya Takase
RIDEBACK -Re-mix ver.-
Lyrics: Mell
Composition: Kazuya Takase
Arrangement: Ken Morioka
RIDEBACK -instrumental-

Sales trajectory

References

2009 singles
2009 songs
Anime songs
Mell songs
Song recordings produced by I've Sound